The McGirr ministry (1947) or First McGirr ministry was the 52nd ministry of the New South Wales Government, and was led by the 28th Premier, Jim McGirr, of the Labor Party. The ministry was the first of three occasions when the Government was led by McGirr, as Premier.

McGirr was first elected to the New South Wales Legislative Assembly in 1922 and served continuously until 1952, holding the various seats of Cootamundra, Cumberland, Bankstown, and Liverpool. McGirr was a staunch supporter of Jack Lang and served in the third Lang ministry, he was the only Langite to be appointed to William McKell's first ministry, retaining his portfolio in the second McKell ministry. When McKell stood aside as Premier in 1947 in order to take up an appointment as Governor-General of Australia, there was a bitter struggle for the Labor Leadership between McGirr and Bob Heffron, with McGirr eventually winning by just two votes.

This ministry covers just 102 days, from 6 February 1947 until the 1947 state election, held on 19 May, when McGirr led Labor to victory and the Second McGirr ministry was sworn in.

Composition of ministry

The composition of the ministry was announced by Premier McGirr on 6 February 1947 and covers until 19 May 1947 when the 1947 state election was held. There were minimal changes from the second McKell ministry, with Clive Evatt replacing McGirr as Minister for Housing and Frank Finnan replacing Evatt.

 
Ministers are members of the Legislative Assembly unless otherwise noted.

See also

References

 

! colspan="3" style="border-top: 5px solid #cccccc" | New South Wales government ministries

New South Wales ministries
1947 establishments in Australia
1947 disestablishments in Australia
Australian Labor Party ministries in New South Wales